Acantopsis octoactinotos, the long-nosed loach, is a freshwater fish from Indonesia, commonly found in aquariums.

Acantopsis octoactinotos has a long straight snout, unlike the similar Horseface loach (Acantopsis choirorhynchus), in which the snout has a down-turned shape. The long-nosed loach reaches  in length, males typically being smaller and slenderer than females.

References

External links
 Loaches online - Community Edition: Acantopsis octoactinotos

Cobitidae
Fish described in 1991